Jelena Erić (born 15 January 1996 in Kraljevo) is a Serbian professional racing cyclist, who currently rides for UCI Women's WorldTeam .

Major results

2011
 National Road Championships
1st  Road race
3rd Time trial
2012
 2nd Road race, National Road Championships
2014
 National Road Championships
1st  Road race
1st  Time trial
 8th Road race, UCI World Junior Road Championships
2015
 7th Crescent Vårgårda UCI Women's WorldTour TTT
2016
 National Road Championships
1st  Road race
1st  Time trial
2017
 National Road Championships
1st  Road race
1st  Time trial
 3rd Grand Prix de Dottignies
 4th Tour of Guangxi#Tour of Guangxi Women's Elite World Challenge
 6th Overall Tour of Zhoushan Island
2018
National Road Championships
1st  Road race
1st  Time trial
2019
 National Road Championships
1st  Road race
1st  Time trial
 1st Stage 2 BeNe Ladies Tour
2020
 10th Omloop van het Hageland
 10th La Périgord Ladies
2021
 National Road Championships
1st  Road race
 2nd Ronde de Mouscron
 8th GP Oetingen
2022
 National Road Championships
1st  Road race
  1st Stage 3  Vuelta Ciclista Andalucia Ruta Del Sol
 4th GP City of Eibar

See also
 List of 2015 UCI Women's Teams and riders

References

External links
 

1996 births
Living people
Serbian female cyclists
Sportspeople from Kraljevo
European Games competitors for Serbia
Cyclists at the 2019 European Games